The following are the national records in track cycling in Thailand, maintained by its national cycling federation, Thai Cycling Association.

Men

Women

References

External links
Thai Cycling Association

Thailand
records
track cycling
track cycling